Allur is a village in Thiruvaiyaru block, Thanjavur district in Tamil Nadu state. It is one of the 49 villages in the Thiruvaiyaru block. The postal code of the village is 613101.

Population
The total population of the village is 2219 in 525 houses. Male population is 1102 and the female population is 1117. There are 218 children in the village.

Literacy rate 
The literacy rate of the total population of the village is 71%. Male literacy rate is 77% and female literacy rate is just 66%.628 out of 2219 are illiterate people in Allur.

Other information
 The total area of the village is 5.25 sq.kilometers.
 15 kilometers away from Thiruvaiyaru, the block's headquarters.
 22 kilometers away from Thanjavur, the district's headquarters.
 Nearest town is Thirukkattupalli.

References

Villages in Thanjavur district